Jennifer Stevens is a Canadian politician, who was elected to the Legislative Assembly of Ontario in the 2018 provincial election. She represents the riding of St. Catharines as a member of the Ontario New Democratic Party. Prior to her election in the legislature, she was a city councillor for 15 years for St. Catharines City Council.

Background
Stevens has a background in the not-for profit sector, serving on the board of the Niagara Folk Arts Multicultural Centre. She also served on the Merritton Athletic Association.

Political career
Stevens' political career began in municipal politics. She served as city councillor for 15 years, for St. Catharines City Council, representing Merriton Ward (Ward 1), located in the city's southeast. Stevens' first foray into provincial politics was in the 2014 Ontario general election, where she was unsuccessful against Liberal incumbent Jim Bradley. In the 2018 Ontario general election, Stevens defeated Bradley, becoming the first woman to represent St. Catharines in the legislature. Stevens was re-elected in the 2022 Ontario general election, defeating Progressive Conservative candidate and St Catharines city councillor Sal Sorrento.

Electoral record

2014 St. Catharines City Council Election - Ward 1 - Merriton

2010 St. Catharines City Council Election - Ward 1 - Merriton

2006 St. Catharines City Council Election - Ward 1 - Meritton

2003 St. Catharines City Council Election - Ward 1 - Merriton

2000 St. Catharines City Council Election - Ward 1 - Merriton

References

Ontario New Democratic Party MPPs
21st-century Canadian politicians
21st-century Canadian women politicians
Living people
St. Catharines city councillors
Women MPPs in Ontario
Year of birth missing (living people)